Mark William Pocan (born August 14, 1964) is an American politician and businessman serving as the U.S. representative from Wisconsin's 2nd congressional district since 2013. The district is based in the state capital, Madison. A member of the Democratic Party, Pocan is co-chair of the Congressional LGBT Equality Caucus and chair emeritus of the Congressional Progressive Caucus. From 1999 to 2013 he served as a member of the Wisconsin State Assembly, representing the 78th district, succeeding Tammy Baldwin there, whom he also replaced in the House when Baldwin was elected to the U.S. Senate.

Early life and education
Pocan was born and raised in Kenosha, Wisconsin. He graduated from Harvey Elementary School, Washington Junior High School, and Mary D. Bradford High School in 1982, where he was elected senior class president. He attended the University of Wisconsin–Madison, earning a bachelor's degree in journalism in 1986.

Early career 
Shortly after graduating, Pocan opened up his own small business, a printing company named Budget Signs & Specialties, which he continues to own and run as of 2012. He is a member of the AFL–CIO, which he joined as a small business owner.

Pocan's active years at UW–Madison in College Democrats led to his election in 1991 to the Dane County Board of Supervisors, where he served Madison’s downtown community for three terms, leaving the board in 1996.

Wisconsin Assembly

Elections
In 1998 Pocan's longtime friend and ally, Tammy Baldwin, gave up her seat in the Wisconsin State Assembly to make a successful run for Congress. Pocan ran to succeed her in the western Madison district and won a three-way Democratic primary with 54% of the vote. He faced no Republican opponent in the general election and won with 93% of the vote against an independent. He won reelection in 2000 with 81%—the only time he faced a Republican challenger. He was unopposed for reelection from 2002 to 2010.

Tenure
As a state legislator, Pocan earned a reputation for moving the Wisconsin political debate to the left. One of the most outspoken progressive members of the state assembly, he focused on difficult issues, including corrections reform, the state budget, education funding, and fighting privatization schemes.

For six years Pocan sat on the Joint Finance Committee, including a term as co-chair. He also took on a leading role among Assembly Democrats, running caucus campaign efforts in 2008 when Democrats went from five seats down to retaking the majority for the first time in 14 years.

Committee assignments
Committee on Urban and Local Affairs
Committee on Colleges and Universities
Joint Survey Committee on Retirement Systems
Joint Finance Committee

U.S. House of Representatives

Tenure
In 2023, Pocan was among 56 Democrats to vote in favor of H.Con.Res. 21, which directed President Joe Biden to remove U.S. troops from Syria within 180 days.

Elections

In 2012, Baldwin gave up her congressional seat in order to run for the U.S. Senate and Pocan decided to run in the open 2nd congressional district. He won a four-candidate Democratic primary with 72% of the vote. He won all 7 counties in the district, including the heavily populated Dane County with 74% of the vote. The 2nd is so heavily Democratic that the Democratic primary was considered the real contest, and it was widely believed that Pocan had assured himself a seat in Congress by winning it. On November 6, 2012, Pocan won the general election, defeating Republican Chad Lee 68%–32%.

Committee assignments
Committee on Appropriations
Subcommittee on Agriculture, Rural Development, Food and Drug Administration and Related Agencies
Subcommittee on Financial Services and General Government
Subcommittee on Labor, Health and Human Services, Education, and Related Agencies
Committee on Education and Labor
Subcommittee on Higher Education and Workforce Investment

Caucus memberships
Congressional Progressive Caucus
Congressional LGBT Equality Caucus (Co-chair)
Veterinary Medicine Caucus
Congressional Animal Protection Caucus
Medicare for All Caucus
Blue Collar Caucus
 Congressional Freethought Caucus

Political activism 

Pocan identifies as a progressive Democrat, and is a member of organizations including Wisconsin Citizens Action, the American Civil Liberties Union, Fair Wisconsin and Midwest Progressive Elected Officials Network. He is also one of the few progressive Democrats to have joined the American Legislative Exchange Council (ALEC), a conservative-leaning organization that produces model legislative proposals. Pocan used his membership to investigate the organization's agenda and sponsors and wrote a series of articles on his experiences with ALEC for the Madison-based magazine The Progressive from 2008 to 2011. On the September 29, 2012, edition of Moyers and Company, Pocan said, "ALEC is a corporate dating service for lonely legislators and corporate special interests that eventually the relationship culminates with some special-interest legislation and hopefully that lives happily ever after as the ALEC model. Unfortunately what's excluded from that equation is the public."

In September 2018 Pocan supported legislation invoking the War Powers Resolution of 1973 to stop U.S. involvement in the Saudi-led intervention in Yemen, saying, "The world’s worst humanitarian crisis has been triggered by our secretive, illegal war in Yemen waged alongside the Saudi regime. As the Saudis use famine as a weapon of war, starving millions of innocent Yemenis to near death, the United States fuels, coordinates and provides bombs for Saudi airstrikes, and secretly deploys the military to participate in on-the-ground operations with Saudi troops.”

In April 2019, after the House passed the resolution withdrawing American support for the Saudi-led coalition in Yemen, Pocan was one of nine lawmakers to sign a letter to President Trump requesting a meeting with him and urging him to sign "Senate Joint Resolution 7, which invokes the War Powers Act of 1973 to end unauthorized US military participation in the Saudi-led coalition's armed conflict against Yemen's Houthi forces, initiated in 2015 by the Obama administration." They asserted the "Saudi-led coalition's imposition of an air-land-and-sea blockade as part of its war against Yemen’s Houthis has continued to prevent the unimpeded distribution of these vital commodities, contributing to the suffering and death of vast numbers of civilians throughout the country" and that Trump's signing the resolution would give a "powerful signal to the Saudi-led coalition to bring the four-year-old war to a close."

Pocan supports decreasing U.S. military spending. Pocan, Pramila Jayapal and Barbara Lee attempted to reduce the size of the $740 billion National Defense Authorization Act for Fiscal Year 2021, but their motion was rejected 93-324. The Congressional Progressive Caucus cochairs Jayapal and Pocan declared: "Every handout to Lockheed Martin or Northrop Grumman is money that could have been spent on ending [COVID-19] pandemic, keeping small businesses afloat and staving off an economic meltdown."

In 2019 Pocan supported the Equality Act, a bill that would expand the federal Civil Rights Act of 1964 to ban discrimination based on sexual orientation and gender identity.

In July 2019 Pocan voted against a House resolution introduced by Democratic Congressman Brad Schneider of Illinois opposing the Global Boycott, Divestment, and Sanctions Movement targeting Israel. The resolution passed 398-17.

On December 18, 2019, Pocan voted for both articles of impeachment against President Trump.

In January 2020, Pocan endorsed Senator Bernie Sanders for president.

In May 2021, Pocan and Representatives Rashida Tlaib and Alexandria Ocasio-Cortez drafted a resolution to block the sale of precision-guided weapons to Israel after the Biden administration approved the sale.

Personal life 
Pocan is openly gay. He credits his political activism in part to an incident soon after he graduated from college and opened his printing business, when two men followed him after he left a gay bar and beat him with a baseball bat while they called him "faggot" and other anti-gay slurs. This gaybashing incident spurred him to become active in the Madison LGBT community. Pocan was the only openly gay member of the state Assembly after Tammy Baldwin's election to Congress, and one of three LGBT members of the 100th Wisconsin Legislature, alongside Sen. Tim Carpenter (D–Milwaukee) and bisexual Rep. JoCasta Zamarripa (D–Milwaukee).

On November 24, 2006, Pocan and his long-term partner, Philip Frank, were legally married in Toronto, Ontario.

Pocan's brother, William S. Pocan, serves as a circuit court judge in Milwaukee County.

Pocan is among the few U.S. representatives not to identify with any religion.

Awards and honors
Pocan has received the following recognitions while in office:
Fair Wisconsin Statewide Leader Award (2009)
Planned Parenthood Rebecca Young Leadership Award (2009)
Professional Firefighters of Wisconsin Legislator of the Year (2008)
Wisconsin Library Association’s Public Policy Award (2008)
Wisconsin Coalition Against Sexual Assault Voices of Courage Public Policy Award (2008)
Wisconsin League of Conservation Voters Honor Roll (2008)
Wisconsin Aids Fund award (2007)
Wisconsin League of Conservation Voters Conservation Champion (2006)
Wisconsin Counties Association Outstanding Legislator Award (2006 & 2008)
Clean Wisconsin Clean 16 Award (2004, 2002 & 2000)
ACLU Special Recognition Award (2001)
Wisconsin Federation of Teachers State Employees Council Representative of the Year (2003 & 2002)
Outreach Man of the Year (1999)

Electoral history

Wisconsin Assembly (1998–2010)

U.S. House of Representatives (2012–present)

See also
 List of LGBT members of the United States Congress

References

Further reading
Meet Mark Pocan, the Original ALEC Spy, Molly Redden, The New Republic, July 25, 2012 | 9:05

External links

Congressman Mark Pocan official U.S. House website
Mark Pocan for Congress

 

1964 births
21st-century American politicians
Businesspeople from Madison, Wisconsin
County supervisors in Wisconsin
Democratic Party members of the United States House of Representatives from Wisconsin
Gay politicians
LGBT people from Wisconsin
LGBT members of the United States Congress
LGBT state legislators in Wisconsin
Living people
Mary D. Bradford High School alumni
Democratic Party members of the Wisconsin State Assembly
Politicians from Kenosha, Wisconsin
Politicians from Madison, Wisconsin
University of Wisconsin–Madison School of Journalism & Mass Communication alumni